Liceo Latinoamericano is a Chilean high school located in Pichidegua, Cachapoal Province, Chile.

References 

Educational institutions established in 1964
1964 establishments in Chile
Secondary schools in Chile
Schools in Cachapoal Province